The Montana Grizzlies and Lady Griz are the nicknames given to the athletic teams of the University of Montana, located in Missoula. The university is a member of the Big Sky Conference and competes in  NCAA Division I, fielding six men's teams (basketball, football, cross country, tennis, and track and field (indoor and outdoor)) and nine women's teams (basketball, cross country, golf, soccer, softball, tennis, track and field (indoor and outdoor), and volleyball). The football team has won the university's only two NCAA championships.

History

Nickname and mascot

Originally known as the Bears with a live black bear named Teddy as the mascot, the university's basketball team officially became the Grizzlies (sometimes called the Silvertips) in 1923 when they were admitted to the Pacific Coast Conference (PCC).  That same year Montana became the first state in the nation to designate grizzlies as a protected game animal. This name change would later prove problematic, however, for their new PCC conference-mate UCLA who had also recently changed their name to the Grizzlies. When UCLA petitioned to join the conference in 1926, Montana claimed rights to the name and the UCLA Grizzlies became the UCLA Bruins when they were admitted to the conference in 1928.

The Grizzlies continued to use live bears as mascots until the early 1960s.  In addition to Teddy, there was a Cocoa, Chester, and three different Fessy's named after former football coach Doug Fessenden, among several others.  In the 1970s and 1980s costumed mascots were introduced, but as mascots of local sponsors, not the university.  This included the Hamm's Beer bear, a chicken from a local radio station, and even Ronald McDonald.  Later in the 1980s, a costumed mascot by the name of Grizzly Otto (after local sponsor Grizzly Auto) was introduced as part of the Montana cheer squad.  The current mascot, Monte (short for Montana), was introduced in 1993 and in 2002 became the first winner of the Capital One Bowl's "Mascot of the Year" contest.  He won again in 2004 and was nominated three other times.

Colors

The university's official colors are copper, silver, and gold, and were chosen in recognition of the state's mining history. Contrary to popular perception, these colors have never changed with the confusion stemming from the university's decision to represent "copper" with either maroon or Texas orange  at various times in its history.

When the university was founded in 1893 and its colors chosen, a lack of copper dye led the school to use maroon and occasionally other colors to represent the copper.  This had the effect of having the athletic teams not always being represented across the board by the same uniform colors.  In 1967, then head football coach and athletic director Jack Swarthout, who personally preferred the maroon and silver used by the football team, sought to make the schools colors more consistent and held a vote among UM coaches.  They selected Texas orange (to represent copper) and gold to be used on the school's uniforms and it remained for the next 

The maroon was brought back as part of the university's centennial celebrations in 1993 and a student survey in 1995 showed support for a return to maroon and silver uniforms.  Despite some vocal opposition, by 1997 the colors began to phase into the maroon and silver that continues to be used.

Programs

Football

The football team won national championships in 1995 and 2001 and qualified for a record 17 consecutive playoffs (1993–2009). Football has been played at Montana since 1897, and the Grizzlies have played in their current home, Washington–Grizzly Stadium, since 1986.

The Grizzlies rank among the all time playoff appearance leaders, with appearances in 1982, 1988, 1989, and 1993–2009. The playoff streak is the record at the I-AA level (now FCS).  The continuous streak ended in 2010 with a loss to rival Montana State which ended Montana's season at 7-4 and without an invitation to the post-season for the first time in 18 years.

Montana won the national championship in 1995 under Don Read when Dave Dickenson led the team to a victory over Marshall University in the national championship game. In 2001, coach Joe Glenn led the Montana Grizzlies to another national championship, defeating Furman University by a score of 13–6.

The annual rivalry game against Montana State University of Bozeman is called the Brawl of the Wild. Through 2013, the Griz lead the series 70-37-5. A former rivalry game against the University of Idaho Vandals was for the Little Brown Stein. Montana trails that series at 27-55-2, but the Griz won the last four meetings, between 2000 and 2003.

Entering NFL training camps for the 2012 season, there are 13 players from Montana currently in the NFL.

Men's basketball

The men's basketball team plays its home game at Dahlberg Arena. They have been to the NCAA Division I men's basketball tournament twelve times and the National Invitation Tournament four times.

Women's basketball

The Lady Griz, as the women's basketball team is known, is one of the most successful women's basketball programs in the country. As of the end of the 2008–2009 season they have compiled a 757-252 (.750) record and a 388-85 (.820) conference record. Their head coach was Shannon Schweyen, who was elevated from top assistant during the 2016 offseason following the retirement of Robin Selvig, who had compiled an 865–286 record in 38 seasons with the Lady Griz. They play their games at Dahlberg Arena.

The Lady Griz have made the NCAA Division I Women's Basketball Championship tournament 22 times, compiling a 6–18 record. They've also have 3 WNIT appearances. Through all of their success, the Lady Griz have never advanced past the second round, having reach it 7 times (1984, 1986, 1988, 1989, 1992, 1994, 1995). They have also won 22 regular season conference championships (Northwest Women's Basketball League (2), Mountain West Conference (5), Big Sky Conference (15).

Athletic facilities

University Marching Band

The band has its origins in the late 19th century and has since continued its tradition into the new millennium. Marching in contemporary corps-style, the program endeavors to stay on the cutting edge of trends in outdoor music performances. The program is also one of the most visible organizations on the University of Montana campus, performing at all Grizzly football home games in the 25,500-seat Washington–Grizzly Stadium. The group also travels to several conference games throughout the Northwest and has accompanied the football team to four Division I-AA National Championships in recent years.

Fight song

"Up With Montana"

The lyrics to "Up with Montana" are credited to Dick Howell, a Law student and member of the glee club in the 1910s, "to commemorate the rivalry" for game number twenty-one between UM and Montana State University, in 1914. The origin of the tune itself, however, is disputed.  The Stanford Jonah is a fight song of the University of California, Berkeley written in 1913 by Ted Haley as an entry into a song contest held by the Daily Californian. The song continues to be a hit at most sporting events, but specifically at events between the California Golden Bears and their rival, the Stanford Cardinal. Georgia Tech's "White And Gold" and The Naval Academy's "Up With The Navy" (which gives credit to the University of Montana), also share a similar tune.

Former sports
Montana formerly competed in wrestling, skiing, and women's gymnastics; all three programs were dropped in 1987 due to budget restrictions by the university regents. The baseball program was discontinued following the 1972 season; its Campbell ballpark was adjacent to the north end of Dornblaser Field (II), aligned southeast (home plate to center field).

See also
 List of college athletic programs in Montana

References

External links